The Wielondek family (Polish pronunciation: [vjɛˈlɔntɛk], Wielądko, Wielądek, z Wielądków) is an old Polish nobility family, Nałęcz coat of arms, that first began to gather prominence during the second half of the 15th century.

History 

The first records of Wielądki, the family ancestral seat, date back to 1487. It was most likely founded by a nobleman Nicholas Komorowski-Wielądek, Ostoja coat of arms.

During the period of the Polish-Lithuanian Commonwealth (1569–1795) the estate was the property of the szlachta family Wielądek, Nałęcz coat of arms.

Coat of arms 

The Wielondek family's coat of arms is Nałęcz, quoted by Jan Długosz as one of the oldest Polish coats of arms "Arma baronum Regni Poloniae”. with the earliest preserved seal dating back to 1293.

It is traditionally described as a silver shawl tied on a red background, symbolising unity and harmony. From the 17th century the crest features a young lady in a red dress standing on a jewel-encrusted crown and holding stag’s antlers. Some heraldic sources describe the dress as azure blue

Notable bearers 

 Wojciech Wincenty Wielądko
 Kazimierz Franciszek Czarnkowski
 Joseph Conrad Korzeniowski
 Fryderyk Józef Moszyński
 Count Edward Raczyński (1786–1845)
 Count Edward Aleksander Raczyński
 Count Edward Bernard Raczyński

See also 

 Szlachta

Sources

References 

Polish noble families